Stuart Cochrane (born 20 July 1978) is a former Australian Football League (AFL) and South Australian National Football League (SANFL) footballer who played for the North Melbourne, Port Adelaide and Central District Football Clubs. 

After being delisted at the end of 2005, Cochrane played for Central District in the SANFL before retiring from football after playing in a losing 2006 Grand Final side. He is currently part of Port Adelaide's coaching staff, serving as the club's development coach at AFL level, and as the club's defence coach at SANFL level.

Cochrane's father Richard Cochrane also played for Central District.

References

External links

Port Adelaide Football Club players
Port Adelaide Football Club players (all competitions)
Murray Kangaroos Football Club players
North Melbourne Football Club players
Central District Football Club players
Australian rules footballers from South Australia
1978 births
Living people